Neall Massif is a mountain massif rising between the Salamander and West Quartzite Ranges. Named by the New Zealand Antarctic Place-Names Committee (NZ-APC) for V.E. Neall, geologist of the New Zealand Geological Survey Antarctic Expedition (NZGSAE), 1967–68.

See also
Jago Nunataks

Mountains of Victoria Land
Borchgrevink Coast